Terestrombus fragilis, common name : the Fragile Conch,  is a species of sea snail, a marine gastropod mollusk in the family Strombidae, the true conchs.

Description
The shell size varies between 25 mm and 53 mm.

Distribution
This species is distributed in the western and central part of the Pacific Ocean and along the Philippines.

References

External links
 

Strombidae
Gastropods described in 1798